Capital UK is a radio station broadcasting through the digital platform across the United Kingdom and is owned by Global and operates from the Capital radio network.

Capital UK is available nationally on digital radio, and instead of having local programming, news and adverts like the local Capital stations, it broadcasts the local London shows nationally, and the rest of the time the networked shows, with station-specific national adverts.  It also occasionally broadcasts links exclusive to that station which are not broadcast on Capital London. On the networked and London shows.  But normally it shares links with Capital London.

In January 2011, as part of a brand relaunch, Galaxy stations across the UK were combined with Capital London and the stations of the Hit Music network to form the new multi-station Capital network. Galaxy Digital was replaced by Capital in most areas, except where Capital already broadcast alongside Galaxy (in London on DAB and nationally on digital TV platforms).

On Digital TV platforms it is available on:
Freesat 719
Freeview 724
Sky 0109
TalkTalk 610
Virgin Media 958

References

External links 
 
 Capital - How to Listen - TV

Capital
Radio stations in London